Washington Pope (b. 1826) was a farmer, county commissioner and state legislator who served in the Florida State Senate from 1873 until 1876.

Biography 

Pope was born in 1826 in Florida and worked as a farmer.

He served as the Jackson County county commissioner from 1870 until 1873.

Pope served in the Florida State Senate representing the third senatorial district as a Republican for the 1873, 1874 and 1875 sessions.

See also
 African-American officeholders during and following the Reconstruction era

References

1826 births
People from Jackson County, Florida
Florida state senators
Year of death missing